Neil Jones (born 12 July 1966) is an Australian cricketer. He played one first-class match for New South Wales in 1994/95 and one List A match in 1996/97.

See also
 List of New South Wales representative cricketers

References

External links
 

1966 births
Living people
Australian cricketers
New South Wales cricketers
People from Stourport-on-Severn
Sportspeople from Worcestershire